Douglas Stuart may refer to:
 Douglas Stuart (rower) (1885–1969), British rower
 R. Douglas Stuart (1886–1975), United States Ambassador to Canada (1953–1956)
 R. Douglas Stuart Jr. (1916–2014), founder of the America First Committee, CEO of Quaker Oats, and United States Ambassador to Norway (1984–1989)
 Douglas Stuart, 20th Earl of Moray (1928–2011), British peer
 Douglas G. Stuart (1931–2019), professor of physiology at the University of Arizona
 Douglas Stuart (biblical scholar) (born 1943), professor of the Old Testament at Gordon-Conwell Theological Seminary
 Douglas Stuart (writer) (born 1976), Scottish-American writer

See also
Douglas Stewart (disambiguation)